"City of Angels" is a song by American rapper 24kGoldn. It was released as a single on March 31, 2020, peaking at number 25 on the UK Singles Chart and number 3 on the US Billboard Bubbling Under Hot 100.

Background
The song's title refers the nickname of Los Angeles, City of Angels; Goldn explains during the chorus "the city of angels is where I have my fun".

Music video
The video was directed by Nicholas Jandora and filmed in Los Angeles. Clear skies and swaying palm trees cut to roaring protestors on the picket line, and Goldn strides past them in a red suit, braids flying, to slide into a car with a couple of angels in the form of leggy women in feathery attire. Things go awry, a quick escape results in a car crash and he ends up in heaven.

Remix
On May 19, 2020, English singer Yungblud shared a remix version of "City of Angels".

Charts

Weekly charts

Year-end charts

Certifications

Release history

References

2020 songs
2020 singles
24kGoldn songs
Songs written by 24kGoldn
Songs written by Omer Fedi

American pop punk songs